Windjana Gorge is a gorge in the Kimberley region of Western Australia. It is located within the Windjana Gorge National Park.

The gorge was formed by the Lennard River having eroded away a  section of the Napier Range. The range was formed over 300 million years ago and is composed of Devonian limestone. 

The area is a popular tourist destination and can be easily hiked through in the dry season. The gorge has permanent waterholes and supports a habitat of monsoonal vegetation. Freshwater crocodiles are known to frequent the area.

Travellers are able to see fossils of shells and other marine creatures on some of the rock walls.

History 
The locale is prominent in the recent history of the Bunuba people of the Kimberly region. In the 1890s, the Bunuba man Jandamarra, a former stockman, led an armed insurrection. In late 1894, a posse of 30 or so heavily armed police and settlers attacked Jandamarra and his followers in Windjana Gorge. Jandamarra was wounded but escaped.

References

Canyons and gorges of Western Australia
Kimberley (Western Australia)